Hask Armenological Review (in Armenian Հասկ Հայագիտական Հանդէս transliteration in Western Armenian - Hask Hayakidagan Hantes), was an annual publication on Armenian  studies published by the Catholicosate of the Great See of Cilicia (Holy See of Cilicia). 

Hask Armenological Review was established by Karekin II Sarkissian.  It was an academic journal specializing in Armenian studies as a multilingual journal publishing articles in (Armenian, English, French, and occasionally in other languages.

Armenian studies journals
Multilingual journals
Armenian-language journals
English-language journals
French-language journals
Armenian Apostolic Church